Rodney Charles White (born June 28, 1980) is an American former professional basketball player.  Born in Philadelphia, Pennsylvania, White played college basketball at the University of North Carolina at Charlotte, where he was named the national freshman of the Year by ESPN, and he was selected by the Detroit Pistons with the ninth overall pick of the 2001 NBA Draft.

Professional career

Detroit Pistons (2001–2002) 

Despite his lofty 9th overall selection, White quickly fell out of favor with new Pistons coach Rick Carlisle and played in only 16 games during the 2001-2002 season, averaging 3.5 points in 8.1 minutes.

Denver Nuggets (2002–2005) 
Sensing untapped potential in White, then Denver Nuggets General Manager Kiki Vandeweghe took a gamble in the 2002 offseason, sending a bounty of two players and a future first round pick to Detroit in exchange for White.

White had an inconsistent and tumultuous tenure in Denver. Flashes of brilliance on the offensive end were overshadowed by lack of defensive commitment, drawing the same ire from coach Jeff Bzdelik he had received from Carlisle in Detroit.

Overall, White averaged 7.7 points over 186 games with the Nuggets. His best output coming as an occasional starter during the hapless 17-win 2002-2003 season, in which he averaged 9 points in 72 games.

Golden State Warriors (2005) 
That poor season parlayed into a top pick in the draft, which the Nuggets used to select Carmelo Anthony. With a surefire star in Anthony now on board, Vandeweghe was able to concede failure and package White with fellow bust Nikoloz Tskitishvili. Late in the 2004-2005 season, the pair was dealt to the Golden State Warriors in exchange for Eduardo Nájera, Luis Flores, and a future first round pick. The pick was later sent to the Philadelphia 76ers as part of the Allen Iverson trade.

White played sparingly in 16 games for the Warriors, averaging 5.1 points in 11.7 minutes. White's final NBA game was played on April 20, 2005 in a 106 - 89 win over the Utah Jazz where White recorded 2 points and 1 rebound.

White was released by the Warriors the following summer.

Overseas (2005–2013) 

White's career picked up in Europe, but his journeyman tag remained. White first caught on in the Spanish League with Bàsquet Manresa, followed by a stint with Lagun Aro Bilbao. He was cut by Bilbao on November 1, 2006. The following month, he joined Scavolini-Gruppo Spar Pesaro in the Italian League for the remainder of their season. In November 2007, he joined the Chinese League team Zhejiang Guangsha Lions. He next played with the Arecibo Captains of the Puerto Rican League. In the summer of 2008, he signed a contract with the Euroleague power Maccabi Tel Aviv. He was cut by Maccabi on December 2, 2008. White later played again for Zhejiang Guangsha lions in China. On June 15, 2011 he agreed to sign with the Anyang KGC Basketball team in South Korea.

In 2012, he was signed as an import for the Barako Bull Energy in the Philippine Basketball Association replacing former teammate DerMarr Johnson. He requested for his release due to family reasons after playing six games for the Energy.

In 2013, he was signed by the Petron Blaze Boosters, also in the Philippine Basketball Association, replacing Renaldo Balkman, who had been banned from the league after an altercation with a teammate. White himself was subsequently replaced by Henry Sims.

References

External links
College & NBA stats @ Basketball-reference.com
Euroleague.net Player Profile
Career moves at Hoopshype.com

1980 births
Living people
African-American basketball players
American expatriate basketball people in China
American expatriate basketball people in Italy
American expatriate basketball people in Israel
American expatriate basketball people in South Korea
American expatriate basketball people in Spain
American expatriate basketball people in the Philippines
American men's basketball players
Anyang KGC players
Barako Bull Energy players
Bàsquet Manresa players
Bilbao Basket players
Capitanes de Arecibo players
Charlotte 49ers men's basketball players
Denver Nuggets players
Detroit Pistons draft picks
Detroit Pistons players
Golden State Warriors players
Liga ACB players
Maccabi Tel Aviv B.C. players
Philippine Basketball Association imports
Power forwards (basketball)
San Miguel Beermen players
Shandong Hi-Speed Kirin players
Small forwards
Victoria Libertas Pallacanestro players
Zhejiang Lions players
Basketball players from Philadelphia
21st-century African-American sportspeople
20th-century African-American people